The 1908 Illinois Fighting Illini football team was an American football team that represented the University of Illinois during the 1908 college football season.  In their third non-consecutive season under head coach Arthur R. Hall, the Illini compiled a 5–1–1 record and finished in second place in the Western Conference. Guard F. C. Van Hook was the team captain.

Schedule

Awards and honors
 Forest Van Hook, guard
 Third-team selection by Walter Camp for Collier's Weekly 1908 College Football All-America Team

References

Illinois
Illinois Fighting Illini football seasons
Illinois Fighting Illini football